Maksym Pavlovych Trusevych (born 1 August 1985) is a Ukrainian former professional footballer, who played as a midfielder.

Club career
Trusevych has previously played in the Russian Premier League with FC Rostov and in the Russian First Division with FC Baltika Kaliningrad. He moved to Chornomorets from FC Obolon Kyiv in June 2010.

On 24 June 2018, FC Pyunik announced the signing of Trusevych, leaving at the end of his contract on 16 June 2019.

References

External links
 
 
 Official Website Profile

1985 births
People from Kirovsk, Luhansk Oblast
Living people
Ukrainian footballers
Ukraine under-21 international footballers
Ukrainian expatriate footballers
FC Borysfen Boryspil players
FC Shakhtar Donetsk players
FC Metalurh Zaporizhzhia players
FC Zorya Luhansk players
FC Obolon-Brovar Kyiv players
FC Rostov players
FC Baltika Kaliningrad players
FC Chornomorets Odesa players
Ukrainian Premier League players
Russian Premier League players
Expatriate footballers in Russia
FC SKA-Khabarovsk players
FC Sokol Saratov players
Association football midfielders
FC Tambov players
Sportspeople from Luhansk Oblast